Arthur Luck (19 January 1916 – 24 February 1987) was an English cricketer.  Luck was a right-handed batsman who bowled right-arm medium pace.  He was born at Little Billing, Northamptonshire.

Luck made two first-class appearances for Northamptonshire, both against Warwickshire in the 1937 County Championship and 1938 County Championship.  In his first match against Warwickshire, he scored 18 runs in Northamptonshire's first-innings, before becoming one of seven wickets for Eric Hollies.  In their second-innings, he was dismissed for the same score by George Paine.  In Warwickshire's first-innings, he took the wicket of Aubrey Hill.  In his second match against the county, Luck scored 15 runs in Northamptonshire's first-innings, before being dismissed by Eric Hollies, while in their second-innings the same bowler dismissed him for a single run.  In Warwickshire's first-innings, Luck took the wicket of Reg Santall.  Warwickshire won both matches.

He died at the Gloucestershire Royal Hospital in Gloucester on 24 February 1987.

References

External links
Arthur Luck at ESPNcricinfo
Arthur Luck at CricketArchive

1916 births
1987 deaths
People from Billing, Northamptonshire
English cricketers
Northamptonshire cricketers